Collége-Lycée Privé La Reussite is an Islamic junior and senior high school/high school and sixth-form college in Aubervilliers, Seine-Saint-Denis, France, in the Paris metropolitan area.

It was first established in 2001.

References

External links
 Collége-Lycée La Reussite 

Lycées in Seine-Saint-Denis
Islamic schools in France
2001 establishments in France
Educational institutions established in 2001
Islam in Paris